Göran Petersson (born 14 May 1956) is a former Swedish footballer and midfielder that represented Landskrona BoIS between 1973 and 1989.

Career
Petersson played 581 games for the club, a figure that only has been exceeded by Sonny Johansson. He played in Swedish footballs finest assembly, Allsvenskan for 8 seasons,  scored 10 Allsvenskan goals  and contributed to Landskrona BoIS' Allsvenskan bronze medals in 1975 and 1976. In 1977, he was on the squad that played Ipswich Town F.C. in the first round of the UEFA Cup.

References

Swedish footballers
Living people
Landskrona BoIS players
1956 births
Association football midfielders